Cardiovirus A is a member of the Picornaviridae family. Infection with the virus causes encephalomyocarditis and reproductive disease in pigs. Although a variety of mammals may host the virus, pigs are classed as the domestic host as they are most easily infected. It is thought to be spread by rodents.

The disease can be found worldwide but is of greatest economic importance in tropical areas. It is not thought to be zoonotic.

Clinical signs and diagnosis
Piglets that are infected present with encephalitis, myocarditis and sudden death. Mortality rates can be high. If a sow is infected whilst pregnant she may present with a variety of reproductive signs including infertility, mummification, abortion, still birth and the birth of weak piglets. A variety of gastrointestinal, respiratory and systemic signs may also be seen as the virus infects multiple body systems.

A presumptive diagnosis can be made based on the history and clinical signs. Virus isolation is necessary for definitive diagnosis. Postmortem examination of piglets may or may not reveal cardiac pathology but histopathology should show cardiac and brain abnormalities. Signs in aborted fetuses are highly variable.

References
 Encephalomyocarditis Virus, reviewed and published by Wikivet at http://en.wikivet.net/Encephalomyocarditis_Virus, accessed 06/09/2011

Animal viral diseases
Cardioviruses
Swine diseases